Paraphosphorus is a genus of longhorn beetles of the subfamily Lamiinae, containing the following species:

 Paraphosphorus bipunctatus (Gahan, 1902)
 Paraphosphorus hololeucus Linell, 1896

References

Tragocephalini
Cerambycidae genera